Hepatocystis brosseti is a species of parasitic protozoa that infect mammals. They are transmitted by flies of the genus Culicoides

History

This species was described in 1977 by Miltgen et al.

Geographical distribution

This species is found in Makokou, Gabon.

Description

The cysts are found in the liver and spleen. Once mature the schizonts become extracellular, convoluted and filled with abundant colloidal substance. They are of medium size (diameter 250 micrometres).

Host record

This species infects Franquet's epauletted fruit bat (Epomops franqueti).

References

Parasites of Diptera
Culicoides
Parasites of bats
Haemosporida